Anthony "Tony" Johnson Jr. (born February 6, 1986) is an American mixed martial artist currently competing in the Heavyweight division of Absolute Championship Akhmat where he is the former ACA Heavyweight Champion. A professional competitor since 2008, Johnson has formerly competed for Bellator MMA, ONE Fighting Championship, Fight Nights Global, and King of the Cage. He is the former KOTC Heavyweight Champion. He is ranked #4 in the ACA heavyweight rankings.

Mixed martial arts career

King of the Cage
After going undefeated in his first three professional mixed martial arts fights, Johnson signed with King of the Cage and challenged Tony Lopez for his KOTC heavyweight championship on March 26, 2010, at KOTC: Legacy. Also being the KOTC light heavyweight champion, Lopez was undefeated his last sixteen fights, which marked Johnson's most experienced opponent at the time. Johnson recorded the upset, using his wrestling to defeat the much more experienced Lopez via unanimous decision and becoming the KOTC heavyweight champion in just only his fourth professional fight.

Johnson made his first title defense against then prospect and future UFC light heavyweight champion Daniel Cormier at KOTC: Imminent Danger on August 13, 2010. He lost the fight and KOTC heavyweight championship in the first round via rear-naked choke submission, resulting in his first professional loss.

Johnson rebounded from his loss to Cormier by defeating Boban Simic via unanimous decision on November 13, 2010 at KOTC: Infusion.

Bellator
In April 2011, it was announced that Johnson had signed with Bellator, with his promotional debut expected to take place at Bellator 41 on April 16 against Carlos Flores. Johnson, however, was later replaced by Rudy Aguilar due to unknown reasons. Johnson eventually made his promotional debut against current UFC competitor Derrick Lewis at Bellator 46 on June 25, 2011. He won the fight via unanimous decision by 29–28 on the scorecards.

ONE Fighting Championship
After being sidelined for nearly two years due to issues with his Bellator contract, Johnson signed with Singapore-based promotion ONE Championship and faced former UFC heavyweight champion Tim Sylvia at ONE Fighting Championship: Rise to Power on May 31, 2013. The fight was contested at a catchweight of 271 lbs. after Sylvia missed weight. Johnson won the fight via TKO due to a doctor stoppage in the third round after an elbow by Johnson opened up a cut on Sylvia's forehead.

Johnson next faced Chris Lokteff at ONE Fighting Championship: Warrior Spirit on November 15, 2013. He lost the fight via split decision.

Independent promotions
Over a year later, on November 22, 2014, Johnson faced Robert Neal at V3 Fights: Neal vs. Johnson and won via TKO due to elbows in the very first round.

Return to Bellator
Johnson re-signed with Bellator and faced former Bellator heavyweight champion Alexander Volkov at Bellator 136 on April 10, 2015. He won the fight via split decision. One judge scored the fight 29–28 for Volkov, while the other two judges scored it 29–28 to Johnson.

Johnson faced former professional boxer Raphael Butler at Bellator 148 on January 29, 2016. Johnson utilised his wrestling to take Butler down and wear him down, before the referee stopped the bout in favour of Johnson, late in the third round due to punches (TKO).

Johnson faced Cheick Kongo at Bellator 161 on September 16, 2016. He lost via majority decision. One judge had it 28–28 (even), while the other two judges scored the bout 29–28 in favor of Kongo.

Kickboxing debut
Johnson made his professional kickboxing debut on April 7, 2017 at SUPERKOMBAT World Grand Prix I 2017 in Bucharest, Romania, being defeated by TKO (doctor stoppage) in round 1. If Johnson had won his bout against Lukasz Krupadziorow, he would have face Cătălin Moroșanu at SUPERKOMBAT World Grand Prix II 2017 in Madrid, Spain.

Absolute Championship Akhmat

He fought for the vacant ACA Heavyweight Championship against Daniel Omielańczuk at ACA 114: Omielańczuk vs. Johnson. He won the fight by KO in the first round, becoming the first opponent to knock him out in 36 fights.

Johnson defended his title on April 23, 2021 at ACA 122 against Dmitry Poberezhets. He won the bout via TKO from ground and pound in the third round.

Johnson defended his title against Mukhumat Vakhaev on November 18, 2021 at ACA 132: Johnson vs. Vakhaev. He won the bout after dropping Vakhaev and then finishing him on the ground at the end of the first round.

Johnson was scheduled to make his third title defense against Salimgerey Rasulov at ACA 137 on March 6, 2022. After being unable to obtain a visa in time, Johnson was forced to pull out of the bout.

Johnson was rescheduled against Salimgerey Rasulov for ACA 138 on March 27, 2022. He lost the bout and title after being knocked out in the first round.

Johnson faced Evgeny Goncharov on September 23, 2022 at ACA 145. He lost the bout via knockout at the end of the first round.

Personal life
Johnson has four daughters.

Johnson used to train at Evolution MMA in Miami, FL. A gym owned by Head Coach Dan Monteleone.

Johnson currently trains at Nashville MMA in Nashville, TN.

Championships and accomplishments

Mixed martial arts
King of the Cage
KOTC heavyweight championship (one time)
Absolute Championship Akhmat
ACA Heavyweight Championship (One time)
Two successful title defenses
Went to school with a few real Gs.

Kickboxing record

|-
|-  bgcolor= "#FFBBBB"
| 2017-04-07 || Loss ||align=left| Lukasz Krupadziorow || SUPERKOMBAT World Grand Prix I 2017 || Bucharest, Romania || TKO (doctor stoppage) || 1 || 0:58
|-
|-
| colspan=9 | Legend:

Mixed martial arts record

|-
|Loss
|align=center|16–7–1 (1)
|Evgeny Goncharov
|KO (punch)
|ACA 145: Abdulaev vs. Slipenko
|
|align=center|1
|align=center|4:37
|Saint Petersburg, Russia
|
|-
|Loss
|align=center|16–6–1 (1)
|Salimgerey Rasulov
|TKO (punches)
|ACA 138: Vagaev vs Gadzhidaudov
|
|align=center|1
|align=center|1:40
|Grozny, Russia
| 
|-
| Win
| align=center|16–5–1 (1)
|Mukhumat Vakhaev
|TKO (punches)
|ACA 132: Johnson vs. Vakhaev
|
|align=center|1
|align=center|4:23
|Minsk, Belarus
| 
|-
| Win
| align=center|15–5–1 (1)
| Dmitry Poberezhets
| TKO (punches)
|ACA 122: Johnson vs. Poberezhets
|
|align=center|3
|align=center|4:04
|Minsk, Belarus
| 
|-
| Win
| align=center|14–5–1 (1)
| Daniel Omielańczuk
| KO (punch)
|ACA 114: Omielańczuk vs. Johnson
|
|align=center|1
|align=center|1:09
|Łódź, Poland
| 
|-
| Loss
| align=center| 13–5–1 (1)
| Evgeniy Goncharov
| Decision (unanimous)
| ACA 97: Goncharov vs. Johnson 2
| 
| align=center| 5
| align=center| 5:00
| Krasnodar, Russia
| 
|-
| NC
| align=center| 13–4–1 (1)
| Evgeniy Goncharov
| NC (accidental eye poke)
| ACA 96: Goncharov vs. Johnson
| 
| align=center| 3
| align=center| 0:50
| Lodz, Poland
| 
|-
| Win
| align=center| 13–4–1
| Denis Smoldarev
| Submission (arm-triangle choke)
| ACA 92: Yagshimuradov vs. Celiński
| 
| align=center|1
| align=center|2:42
| Warsaw, Poland
| 
|-
| Win
| align=center| 12–4–1
| D.J. Linderman
| Decision (unanimous)
| Final Fight Championship 34
| 
| align=center|3
| align=center|5:00
| Las Vegas, Nevada, United States
| 
|-
| Draw
| align=center| 11–4–1
| Aleksander Emelianenko
| Draw (majority)
| WFCA 50
| 
| align=center|3
| align=center|5:00
| Moscow, Russia
| 
|-
| Loss
| align=center| 11–4
| Vitaly Minakov
| TKO (punches)
| Fight Nights Global 82: Minakov vs. Johnson
| 
| align=center|2
| align=center|0:38
| Moscow, Russia
| 
|-
|Win
|align=center|11–3
|Magomedbag Agaev
|TKO (punches)
|Fight Nights Global 68: Pavlovich vs. Mokhnatkin
|
|align=center|1
|align=center|1:20
|St. Petersburg, Russia
|
|-
|Loss
|align=center|10–3
|Cheick Kongo
|Decision (majority)
|Bellator 161
|
|align=center|3
|align=center|5:00
|Cedar Park, Texas, United States
|
|-
|Win
|align=center|10–2
|Raphael Butler
|TKO (punches)
|Bellator 148
|
|align=center|3
|align=center|4:24
|Fresno, California, United States
|
|-
|Win
|align=center|9–2
|Alexander Volkov
|Decision (split)
|Bellator 136
|
|align=center|3
|align=center|5:00
|Irvine, California, United States
|
|-
|Win
|align=center|8–2
|Robert Neal
|TKO (elbows)
|V3 Fights: Neal vs. Johnson
|
|align=center|1
|align=center|1:21
|Nashville, Tennessee, United States
|
|-
|Loss
|align=center|7–2
|Chris Lokteff
|Decision (split)
|ONE Fighting Championship: Warrior Spirit
|
|align=center|3
|align=center|5:00
|Kuala Lumpur, Malaysia
|
|-
|Win
|align=center|7–1
|Tim Sylvia
|TKO (doctor stoppage)
|ONE Fighting Championship: Rise to Power
|
|align=center|3
|align=center|3:25
|Pasay, Philippines
|
|-
|Win
|align=center|6–1
|Derrick Lewis
|Decision (unanimous)
|Bellator 46
|
|align=center|3
|align=center|5:00
|Hollywood, Florida, United States
|
|-
|Win
|align=center|5–1
|Boban Simic
|Decision (unanimous)
|KOTC: Infusion
|
|align=center|3
|align=center|5:00
|Las Vegas, Nevada, United States
|
|-
|Loss
|align=center|4–1
|Daniel Cormier
|Submission (rear-naked choke)
|KOTC: Imminent Danger
|
|align=center|1
|align=center|2:27
|Mescalero, New Mexico, United States
|
|-
|Win
|align=center|4–0
|Tony Lopez
|Decision (unanimous)
|KOTC: Legacy
|
|align=center|5
|align=center|5:00
|Reno, Nevada, United States
|
|-
|Win
|align=center|3–0
|Cedric James
|TKO (punches)
|G-Force Fights: Bad Blood 2
|
|align=center|1
|align=center|1:44
|Coral Gables, Florida, United States
|
|-
|Win
|align=center|2–0
|Steven Banks
|Decision (unanimous)
|BGONA: Warriors of the Ring
|
|align=center|3
|align=center|5:00
|Greensboro, North Carolina, United States
|
|-
|Win
|align=center|1–0
|Kenny Garner
|TKO (punches)
|G-Force Fights: Bad Blood 1
|
|align=center|2
|align=center|3:50
|Miami, Florida, United States
|

See also
List of current ACA fighters
List of Bellator MMA alumni
List of male mixed martial artists

References

External links
 
 
 

1986 births
Living people
American male mixed martial artists
Heavyweight mixed martial artists
Mixed martial artists utilizing kickboxing
Bellator male fighters
SUPERKOMBAT kickboxers
African-American mixed martial artists